The small hive beetle (Aethina tumida) is a beekeeping pest. It is endemic to sub-Saharan Africa, but has spread to many other locations, including North America, Australia, and the Philippines.

The small hive beetle can be a destructive pest of honey bee colonies, causing damage to comb, stored honey, and pollen. If a beetle infestation is sufficiently heavy, they may cause bees to abandon their hive. Its presence can also be a marker in the diagnosis of colony collapse disorder for honey bees. The beetles can also be a pest of stored combs, and honey (in the comb) awaiting extraction. Beetle larvae may tunnel through combs of honey, feeding and defecating, causing discoloration and fermentation of the honey.

Distribution
The small hive beetle was first discovered in the United States in 1996 and has now spread to many U.S. states including, California, Connecticut, Florida, Georgia, Hawaii, Iowa, Illinois, Indiana, Kansas, Louisiana, Maryland, Massachusetts, Michigan, Minnesota, Missouri, Nebraska, New Jersey, New York, North Carolina, Ohio, Oklahoma, Pennsylvania, Rhode Island, South Carolina, Tennessee, Texas and Virginia. In the summer of 2015, the discovery of a number of adult beetles as well as one infestation in all stages of brood in British Columbia's Fraser Valley triggered a temporary quarantine.

In Mexico, the small hive beetle has become established in at least eight states. Infestation levels are especially high in tropical areas such as the Yucatán.

The small hive beetle was first detected in Belize in 2016 in the Corozal District.

The small hive beetle has also spread to Australia, being first identified at Richmond, NSW in 2002. Subsequently, it has affected many areas of Queensland and New South Wales. It seems plausible to  assume  that  the  import  of  package  bees, honeybee  or bumblebee  colonies,  queens, hive equipment or even soil constituted the  potential  invasion  pathway of  the  small  hive  beetle; however, at the current state of evidence it is still unclear how small  hive  beetles  actually  reached  Australia.

The small hive beetle has now reached the southern Philippines in southern Mindanao, and there is great concern that it will spread through the country if hives and bees are moved from the southern Mindanao area where the beetle has already been identified.

Small hive beetle was first detected in Calabria southern Italy in September 2014. It is currently confined to the provinces of Reggio Calabria and part of Vibo Valentia, where it has now become naturalized. In 2014 and 2019, outbreaks of infestation occurred in eastern Sicily.

Life history 
Aethina tumida was previously known only from the sub-Saharan regions of Africa where it has been considered a minor pest of bees. The life cycle information is known primarily from studies in South Africa.

The small hive beetle is a member of the family of scavengers or sap beetles. The adult beetle is dark brown to black and about 5–6 mm  in length. The adults may live up to 6 months and can be observed almost anywhere in a hive, although they are most often found on the rear portion of the bottom board of a hive. Female beetles lay irregular masses of eggs in cracks or crevices in a hive. The eggs hatch in 2–3 days into white-colored larvae that will grow to 10–11 mm in length. Larvae feed on pollen and honey, damaging combs, and require about 10–16 days to mature. Larvae that are ready to pupate leave the hive and burrow into soil near the hive. The pupation period may last approximately 3–4 weeks. Newly emerged adults seek out hives, and females generally mate and begin egg laying about a week after emergence. Adult female small hive beetles generally are longer at 5.7 mm than males which are 5.5 mm long, but both are nearly identical in width at about 3.2 mm, although they can vary greatly in size, possibly depending on diet, climate, and other environmental factors.

Damage to colonies and stored honey 

The primary damage to colonies and stored honey caused by the small hive beetle is through the feeding activity of the larvae.
Larvae tunnel through comb with stored honey or pollen, damaging or destroying cappings and comb. Larvae defecate in honey, and the honey becomes discolored from the feces. Activity of the larvae causes fermentation and a frothiness in the honey; the honey develops a characteristic odor of decaying oranges. Damage and fermentation cause honey to run out of combs, creating a mess in hives or extracting rooms. Heavy infestations cause bees to abscond; some beekeepers have reported the rapid collapse of even strong colonies.

Control 
The small hive beetle is considered a secondary pest in South Africa, and as such, has not been the subject of major control efforts. The beetle is most often found in weak or failing hives and rarely affects strong hives. However, differences in the housecleaning traits of the bees found in South Africa and the U.S. may mean very different responses to the beetles. Some early reports from Florida and South Carolina suggest the beetles may be more damaging there than in Africa. Para-dichlorobenzene (PDB) has been used for protecting empty stored combs. Coumaphos bee strips (Bayer Corporation) have been approved for use in hives for the control of small hive beetles in some states under an emergency registration.

Biological control through beneficial soil nematodes specific to the SHB is also effective.

Beneficial nematodes are used by applying them to the soil while suspended in water. They may be applied as a pressurized spray or simply poured from a watering can. Once applied to the soil, Nematodes burrow downward in search of insect pests. Once an insect is found, nematodes enter the body of the insect and release a powerful bacterium which quickly kills the pest. Released bacteria dissolve the internal tissues of the insect which becomes food for nematode growth and development. Mature nematodes then mate and lay eggs to produce more nematodes within the dead insect. Several such generations may occur over just a few days. After the inside of an insect is consumed, tiny infective-stage nematodes leave the dead insect shell and begin searching for more pests. As many as 350,000 nematodes may emerge from a single dead insect after only 10–15 days. Numbers depend on insect size.

There are also several traps currently on the market. The more effective ones are the Beetlejail Baitable, Hood Trap, the Freeman Beetle Trap, the West trap, the Australian, AJ's Beetle Eater, and the Beetle Blaster. All these traps use non-toxic oil to suffocate the beetles. This allows beekeepers to avoid having toxic chemicals in their beehives.

Regulations 
In New South Wales, Australia, infestation of hives by small hive beetle is notifiable as a honey bee pest under the Stock Diseases Act 1923. The maximum penalty for failing to notify is $11,000.

References

Sources 

The Small Hive Beetle Department of Entomology, Virginia Tech, June 1999, accessed Sep 2005
The Small Hive Beetle: A serious threat to European apiculture The Food and Environment Research Agency, UK Nov 2010, accessed Dec 2011
Somerville, Doug Study of the small hive beetle in the USA  Rural Industries Research and Development Corporation, Jun 2003, accessed Dec 2011
Ellis J, Ellis A,. (2010). Small hive beetle, Aethina tumida (Murray). Featured Creatures.  6 July 2010.
Rhodes, John; Livestock Officer, Tamworth Small hive beetle - an in-hive control device using diatomaceous earth (2008)
Annand, Nicholas Small hive beetle management options NSW DPI Australia, March 2008, accessed Dec 2011
HawaiiNewsNow Bee parasite the latest threat to Hawaiis honey industry May 5, 2010

External links
 Map of US distribution @ Center for Environmental and Research Information Systems (CERIS)

Nitidulidae
Western honey bee pests
Beetles of Africa
Agricultural pest insects
Beekeeping
Beetles described in 1867